Xingu may refer to:
 Distinctly Brazilian topics:
 Major, and also original, senses:
 Xingu River, in north Brazil, southeast tributary of the Amazon
 Xingu peoples, indigenous peoples living near the Xingu River
 Xingu Indigenous Park, located in the state of Mato Grosso, Brazil
 Strongly related to the river and/or peoples:
 Xingu (film), 2011 Brazilian drama by director Cao Hamburger
 Roman Catholic Territorial Prelature of Xingu, located in the area of the Xingu River
 Xingu corydoras (Corydoras xinguensis), a tropical freshwater fish
 Xingu River ray (Potamotrygon leopoldi), a tropical freshwater ray endemic to the river
 Xingu Beer, a beer named after the river.
 Embraer EMB 121 Xingu, twin turboprop light airplane

 Exotic names (but lacking obvious relationship to Latin America):
 Xingu Hill, a project of musician John Sellekaers
 Prose fiction:
 Xingu, character in James Thurber's children's book The 13 Clocks
 Xingu and Other Stories, early short-story collection by Edith Wharton